David Moses Mitzkun (May 1836 – July 23, 1887) was a Russian Hebraist. He was a writer of Hebrew prose and poetry, and maintained himself chiefly by teaching Hebrew. A collection of his Hebrew poems entitled Kinnor David was published in Vilna in 1863.

References
 

1836 births
1887 deaths
19th-century Lithuanian Jews
19th-century Lithuanian writers
19th-century Jews from the Russian Empire
Hebrew-language writers
Lithuanian male writers
People of the Haskalah
Russian Hebraists
Writers from Vilnius
Hebrew-language poets